Youngnak (YN) Presbyterian Church was founded in Seoul on 2 December 1945 by 1992 Templeton Prize recipient, Kyung-Chik Han.  Inaugurated by twenty-seven refugees from Soviet-occupied Korea, Youngnak steadily increased in membership as more refugees sought religious freedom below the 38th parallel.

On 24 March 1949, ground was broken for a new facility to replace the building and tent that had become too small for the growing congregation.  By the time the new church building was completed in May 1950, membership had increased to over 4,000.  By 1992, when Rev. Han was awarded the Templeton Prize for Progress in Religion, membership had grown to 60,000 (making it, at that time, the largest Presbyterian congregation in the world), excluding 500 sister churches planted by members of the original congregation.

In 1998, under the auspices of Rev. Han, who at the time was a Pastor Emeritus, Youngnak gained an English language ministry, International Worship in English, which was founded by an American missionary to Korea, Bill Majors.  For his efforts, Majors was made an Honorary Citizen of Seoul in 2005.

Senior pastors 
1949-1973: Han Kyung-chik
1973-1985: Park Cho-joon
1985-1997c: Kim Yoon-guk
1988-1997c: Lim Young-soo
1997-2018: Lee Chul-shin
2018-present: Kim Woon-sung

References

External links 
  
 International Worship in English of Youngnak Church
 Photos of Youngnak Presbyterian Church

20th-century Presbyterian churches
Presbyterian churches in Seoul